Ludwig Siebert (born 25 September 1939) is a West German former bobsledder who competed during the 1960s. He won two gold medals in the four-man event at the FIBT World Championships (1962, 1966). The gold in 1966 was awarded following a crash that killed his fellow athlete Toni Pensperger during the four-man event. Pensperger was posthumously awarded the gold medal while Siebert and his surviving teammates Helmut Werzer and Roland Ebert received their golds as well.

Siebert also finished fifth in the four-man event at the 1964 Winter Olympics in Innsbruck.

References

 
 Wallechinsky, David (1984). "Bobsled: Four-man". In The Complete Book of the Olympics: 1896–1980. New York: Penguin Books. p. 561.
 

German male bobsledders
Living people
1939 births
Bobsledders at the 1964 Winter Olympics
Olympic bobsledders of the United Team of Germany